Abby Quinn (born April 14, 1996) is an American actress. She is known for her role in the 2023 M. Night Shyamalan horror film Knock at the Cabin.

Early life and education
Quinn was born in Bloomfield, Michigan. Her parents divorced when she was young. She has played the guitar since she was 7 years old.

Quinn attended Detroit Country Day School. She started a bachelor's degree at Carnegie Mellon University in Pittsburgh, before dropping out to move to Los Angeles to pursue a career in acting.

Career 
Quinn played Ali Jacobs in the 2017 comedy film Landline in her first major film role. She was drawn to the film's portrayal of divorce, as it was different from her own experience. The film was well-received by critics, with Ann Hornaday of The Washington Post writing, "Slate and Quinn are completely believable as sisters who occupy a space between twinlike closeness and alienation."

In 2018, Quinn starred as Josephine Cavallo in the film Radium Girls, alongside Joey King. The film had its world premiere at the 2018 Tribeca Festival. In October of that year, she played Kristy Esposito in the Better Call Saul season 4 finale "Winner", and was cast as Annie Moffat in the 2019 film adaptation of Little Women.

In 2019, Quinn starred as Mabel Buchman in the sitcom Mad About You, alongside Helen Hunt and Paul Reiser. In July 2022, Quinn joined the cast of the comedy horror film Hell of a Summer, alongside D'Pharaoh Woon-A-Tai, Pardis Seremi, Finn Wolfhard, Billy Bryk and Fred Hechinger, with Wolfhard and Bryk directing.

In 2023, Quinn played Adriane, one of the four intruders in the M. Night Shyamalan horror film Knock at the Cabin. The film was well-received by critics and grossed $52.1 million worldwide against a budget of $20 million.

Filmography

Film

Television

References

External links

1996 births
Living people
American film actresses
American television actresses
Actresses from Michigan
21st-century American actresses
People from Bloomfield, Oakland County, Michigan
Carnegie Mellon University alumni